The Balmain Reservoir is a  disused, covered reservoir located under Gladstone Park in Balmain, in the Inner West of Sydney, New South Wales, Australia.

Description

It is divided into two chambers by a  separating wall which supports a walkway. The reinforced concrete roof and park above are supported by concrete pillars spaced at  intervals throughout both chambers.

Access to the reservoir is through the adjoining valve house which extends a further two storeys underground and housed pumping equipment in the lowest level.

The entire facility comprising the reservoir, valve house and remaining equipment is owned and maintained by Sydney Water.

History
Balmain reservoir was built in 1915 by the Metropolitan Board of Water Supply and Sewerage, Sydney, and was originally supplied with water by gravity from Potts Hill. The restoration of Gladstone Park and the erection of a bandstand was made a condition of construction of the reservoir. The facility was made redundant by the commissioning of Petersham Reservoir in 1965 and has remained disused ever since.
 

The neighbouring valve house was constructed in 1917 on the Booth Street frontage of the park and this, together with the footings of the bandstand, can still be seen today. Restoration work on the valve house earned a National Trust of Australia Heritage Award in 2006.

See also
Bankstown Reservoir
Paddington Reservoir

References

Further reading
 Solling, M; Reynolds, P; Leichhardt: On the margins of the city, Allen & Unwin, 1997, .
 Metropolitan Board of Water Supply and Sewerage; Balmain Service Reservoir, Original site and contract plans; Date Unknown.

External links 

 Local Images at InnerWest ImageBank
 Local History Collection, Leichhardt Council

Reservoirs in Sydney
Buildings and structures in Sydney
Sydney Water
Balmain, New South Wales